Suho meso (literally: "dry meat") is a smoked beef preparation eaten in Bosnian, Serbian, and Montenegrin cuisine. The meat is cured in a coarse salt for multiple days before being hung to dry over a fire for multiple days or weeks, depending on the size of meat. This process is traditionally done in the winter to avoid the meat from spoiling. It is similar to Pastirma, except there is no netting involved in holding the meat.

See also

 Beef jerky
 Bresaola
 List of dried foods
 List of smoked foods

References

Dried meat
Smoked meat
Bosnia and Herzegovina cuisine
Serbian cuisine